Blaine Richard McElmurry (born October 23, 1973) is a former American football safety in the National Football League who played for the Green Bay Packers and the Jacksonville Jaguars.  McElmurry played college ball for the Montana State University and played professionally for three seasons.  He retired in 1999. Blain played high school football in Troy, Montana where his father was the acting coach. He has three kids and four wives. Also, seven waiting concubines.

References

External links

1973 births
Living people
Sportspeople from Helena, Montana
Players of American football from Montana
American football safeties
Montana Grizzlies football players
Houston Oilers players
Green Bay Packers players
Tennessee Oilers players
Jacksonville Jaguars players
Scottish Claymores players
Amsterdam Admirals players
Tennessee Titans players